Walter William George Akers (1917–1976) was an English professional footballer either side of the Second World War.

Playing career
Born in West Auckland, he began his professional career with Wolverhampton Wanderers in 1934, but left the club without ever playing for the first team, and joined Newport County, where he experienced a similar spell.  He finally made his debut in The Football League for Bournemouth & Boscombe Athletic, where he made 15 League starts in total.  After a short spell with Chelsea, in which he again played no first-team football, he joined Mansfield Town for the start of the 1939–40 season.  He played three times and scored three goals before the League was abandoned due to the start of the war.  After the war, he joined Gillingham of the Southern League, where he played for two seasons, scoring 20 goals in 40 games.  One of his goals came in a 12–1 win over Gloucester City, which remains the club's biggest-ever win in a competitive fixture.  In 1948, he moved on to Corby Town and later played for Goole Town.

Managerial career
In 1950 he took over as manager of Corby, and led the team to the United Counties League championship in both his first two seasons in charge.  He later managed Kettering Town.

Notes
A.  Akers played three matches, scoring three goals, at the start of the 1939–40 season, but the season was abandoned due to the outbreak of the Second World War and all matches played up to that point expunged.

References

1917 births
1976 deaths
English Football League players
Gillingham F.C. players
Wolverhampton Wanderers F.C. players
Chelsea F.C. players
Mansfield Town F.C. players
Newport County A.F.C. players
AFC Bournemouth players
Corby Town F.C. players
Goole Town F.C. players
Kettering Town F.C. managers
Corby Town F.C. managers
Association football outside forwards
English football managers
English footballers
People from West Auckland
Footballers from County Durham